The Telmac 1800 was an early microcomputer delivered in kit form. It was introduced in 1977 by Telercas Oy, the Finnish importer of RCA microchips. Most of the 2,000 kits manufactured over four years were bought by electronics enthusiasts in Finland, Sweden and Norway.

A  Tiny BASIC could be run on this configuration.

The first-ever commercial video game to be developed in Finland, Chesmac (fi), was developed by Raimo Suonio on a Telmac 1800 computer in 1979.

The Telmac 1800 was followed by the Oscom Nano and the Telmac 2000.

Major features
 RCA 1802 (COSMAC) microprocessor CPU @ 1.75 MHz
 Cassette tape interface
 2 kB RAM, expandable to 4 kB
 RCA CDP1861 'Pixie' video chip, 64×128 pixels display resolution
 Sound limited to a fixed frequency tone 
 Able to run a CHIP-8 interpreter

References

External links
Revival Studios Developer of new Chip-8/SuperChip/MegaChip8 games.
Telmac 1800 schematics.

See also
Telmac TMC-600

Early microcomputers
8-bit computers